Joseph Peter Kracher (November 4, 1913 – December 24, 1981) was a catcher in Major League Baseball. Nicknamed "Jug", he played for the Philadelphia Phillies in 1939.

References

External links

1913 births
1981 deaths
Major League Baseball catchers
Philadelphia Phillies players
Minor league baseball managers
Baseball players from Philadelphia
Hammond Berries players